The Coleman River Scenic Area is located in Rabun County, Georgia in the Chattooga River District of the Chattahoochee National Forest. It is located at the point of confluence of Coleman River with the Tallulah River. The scenic area consists of  encompassing lower Coleman River and was dedicated in 1960 to "Ranger Nick" Nicholson following his 40 years of public service.

The scenic area includes a  trail called the Coleman River Trail that parallels Coleman River upstream through stands of large old-growth timber.  While there are no waterfalls, there are several cascades of water over rocks and boulders.  Plenty of native plants such as Mountain Camellia, mountain laurel and rhododendron grow in the area.

References

External links
Coleman River Scenic Area
Coleman River Trail 

Protected areas of Rabun County, Georgia
Chattahoochee-Oconee National Forest